Nuestra Belleza Nayarit 2011, was held at the Disco Palazzo of Tepic, Nayarit on July 8, 2011. At the conclusion of the final night of competition Linda Ugarte from Tepic was crowned the winner. Ugarte was crowned by outgoing Nuestra Belleza Nayarit titleholder Priscila Zarate. Eight contestants competed for the title.

Results

Placements

Judges
Patricia Brogeras - Regional Coordinator of Nuestra Belleza México
Rocío Mondragón - DIF Nayarit Director
Richard Zarkim - Rivera Nayarit Brand Manager
Noé Moreno - Revista Rostros Director
Estrella Morales - Nuestra Belleza Nayarit 2002

Background Music
Kakoy

Contestants

References

External links
Official Website

Nuestra Belleza México